The Women's team time trial of the 2013 UCI Road World Championships took place on 22 September 2013 in the region of Tuscany, Italy.

Qualification
Invitations were sent to the 20 leading UCI Women's Teams in the 2013 UCI Team Ranking on 15 August 2013. Teams that accepted the invitation within the deadline had the right to participate. The Italian team Vaiano Fondriest (placed 23rd) also received an invitation. Every participating team selected six riders from its team roster (excluding stagiaires) to compete in the event.

The UCI women's teams that received an invitation are listed below in order of the team ranking as of 15 August. Teams that did not accept the invitation are listed below in italics. In total sixteen teams from eignt nations (where the teams are based) participated.

Preview
, which won the team time trial at the 2012 Championships, was the favourite for the event.

As well as this,  won all team time trials held during the 2013 season; at the Lotto–Belisol Belgium Tour, they won the  team time trial by 35 seconds from Orica–AIS, while  did not participate.

Schedule

Source

Final classification

References

Women's team time trial
UCI Road World Championships – Women's team time trial
2013 in women's road cycling